Rodrigo Agustin Saravia Salvia (born 17 August 2000) is a Uruguayan professional footballer who plays as a midfielder for Peñarol.

Career
Saravia is a youth academy graduate of Peñarol. In August 2021, he joined Racing Montevideo on loan until the end of the season. He made his professional debut on 16 September 2021 in a 2–1 league win against Uruguay Montevideo.

Career statistics

Honours
Peñarol
 Supercopa Uruguaya: 2022

References

External links
 

2000 births
Living people
Footballers from Montevideo
Association football midfielders
Uruguayan footballers
Uruguayan Primera División players
Uruguayan Segunda División players
Peñarol players
Racing Club de Montevideo players